Haikou Nandu River Water Diversion Project is a project to divert water from the Nandu River to parts of Haikou Prefecture, in particular, an agricultural area west of Haikou City where lychee are grown.

Tunnel construction

The project is ongoing in 2017 and includes a pumping station on the east bank of the Nandu River just south of the Longtang Dam. Tunnels are being bored from the west side of the Nandu westward to the areas where the water is needed. This involves underground blasting and the creation of numerous pits along the route for equipment access.

References

External links
 

Buildings and structures in Haikou
Aqueducts in China
Irrigation in China